Philip McShane (18 February 1932 – 1 July 2020) was an Irish philosopher and mathematician.
He was born in  Baileboro, Co. Cavan. When the McShane family moved to Dublin, Philip went to O'Connell School. He continued his education while training as a Jesuit at University College Dublin (BSc and MSc in relativity theory and quantum mechanics), St Stanislaus College, Tullabeg (Lic. Phil), Heythrop College (STL) and Campion Hall, Oxford (D.Phil). His dissertation "The Concrete Logic of Discovery of Statistical Science" was later published as Randomness, Statistics, and Emergence. He was ordained a Jesuit in 1963, and spent 25 years in the order before leaving the priesthood in the 1980s. He lectured in Mathematics in UCD, in Philosophy in the Milltown Institute, and Mount Saint Vincent University, Halifax, Nova Scotia. Dr. McShane served as visiting fellow in religious studies at Lonergan College, Concordia University, Montreal.  In 1975, along with Conn O'Donovan, he founded The Dublin Lonergan Centre, in Milltown Park, Dublin.

McShane published numerous articles and 25 books on scientific, philosophical, methodological, theological, and economic topics. His published works range from technical works on the foundations of mathematics, probability theory, evolutionary process, and methodology to essays on the philosophy of education and three introductory texts focusing on critical thinking, linguistics, and economics.  On various occasions and in various countries—including Mexico, Korea, Australia, Canada, and the U.S.—he has presented the key issues underlying the significant transition from the descriptive muddles of Marxist, neo-Marxist, Keynesian, and neo-Keynesian analyses to an empirically verifiable democratic economics.

McShane is, perhaps, the premier interpreter of Bernard Lonergan’s novel, timely, and relevant paradigm shift towards economic science.  In addition to editing Lonergan’s economic manuscript For a New Political Economy for publication, he has published five books and numerous articles introducing the basic insights of two-flow analysis. McShane also edited Lonergan’s Phenomenology and Logic: The Boston College Lectures on Mathematical Logic and Existentialism, and together with Pierrot Lambert he co-authored Bernard Lonergan: His Life and Leading Ideas.  He is considered by many the leading interpreter of Insight: A Study of Human Understanding, a compendious work in which Lonergan lays out both a genetic method for studying organic development and some canons for a methodological hermeneutics. McShane treated both of these topics in Interpretation from A to Z.

In 1995 McShane retired from teaching and began to accept international invitations to speak. He gave keynote addresses at conferences in Canada, Australia, England, the U.S., Korea, India, Australia, Mexico, Columbia, and Ireland. In his keynote address "Arriving in Cosmopolis," which he delivered at the First Latin-American Lonergan Workshop in Puebla, Mexico, in June 2011, he provided estimates for the numbers of specialists—identified by Lonergan as Researchers, Interpreters, Historians, Dialecticians, Foundational (persons), Doctrines or Policy (makers), Systemetizers, and Communicators—efficiently collaborating around the globe when the earth's total population reaches 10 billion. In the last years of his life, he wrote repeatedly about the negative Anthropocene age in which we live and a future positive Anthropocene age of luminous collaboration. In Questing2020, his final series of essays, he wrote of the possibility of human collaboration mirroring the psychic adaptation of starling murmuration.

When McShane died in July of 2020, colleagues and former students around the globe paid tribute to him. One person described him as an “African elder,” another as someone who “gave counsel to think long-term, in terms of centuries rather than years or even decades,” and a third as “someone I could always be myself around, even when I was angsty, anxious, or depressed … a friend, mentor, professor, and family member all at once.” A former student described “being amazed, when I asked him some questions, at his generosity—he tore out a chapter of something he was working on and gave it to me there and then.”

Publications 
'The Foundations of Mathematics' by Philip McShane SJ, The Modern Schoolman, XL, May 1963.
'Towards Self-Meaning', by Philip McShane and Garrett Barden, Gill, Dublin, 1968.
'Music That Is Soundless', by Philip McShane SJ, Milltown Press, Dublin, 1968.
'Randomness, Statistics and Emergence', by Philip McShane SJ, Macmillan and University of Notre Dame Presses, 1970. 2nd edition 2021
'Plants and Pianos: Two Essays in Advanced Methodology', by Philip McShane SJ, Milltown Press, Dublin, 1971.
'Wealth of Self and Wealth of Nations', by Philip McShane SJ, Exposition Press, New York, 1973. 2nd edition 2021
'The Shaping of the Foundations', by Philip McShane, University Press of America, 1976.
'Lonergan's Challenge to the University and the Economy', by Philip McShane, University Press of America, 1980.
'Process: Introducing Themselves to Young Christian Thinkers', by Philip McShane, Mt. St. Vincent Press, 1990.
'Economics for Everyone: Das Jus Kapital', by Philip McShane, Commonwealth Press, 1996.
'A Brief History of Tongue', by Philip McShane, Axial Press, Halifax, 1998.
'Interpretation from A to Z', by Philip McShane, Axial Press, Vancouver, 2020.
'The Future: Core Precepts in Supramolecular Method and Nanochemistry', by Philip McShane, Axial Press, Vancouver, 2019.
'The Allure of the Compelling Genius of History: Teaching Young Humans Humanity and Hope', by Philip McShane, Axial Press, Vancouver, 2015.
'Futurology Express', by Philip McShane, Axial Press, Vancouver, 2013.
'Pastkeynes Pastmodern Economics: A Fresh Pragmatism',  by Philip McShane, Axial Press, Halifax, 2002.
'Piketty’s Plight and the Global Future', by Philip McShane, Axial Publishing, Vancouver, 2014.
'Profit: The Stupid View of President Donald Trump', by Philip McShane, Axial Publishing, Vancouver, 2016.
'The Everlasting Joy of Being Human', by Philip McShane, Axial Publishing, Vancouver, 2013.
'The Road to Religious Reality: Method in Theology 101 AD 9011', by Philip McShane, Axial Publishing, Vancouver, 2012.
'Sane Economics and Fusionism', by Philip McShane, Axial Publishing, Vancouver, 2010.
'Bernard Lonergan: His Life and Leading Ideas', by Philip McShane (with Pierrot Lambert), Axial Publishing, Vancouver, 2010.

References 

1932 births
2020 deaths
Alumni of University College Dublin
Irish mathematicians
Irish philosophers
20th-century Irish Jesuits
Alumni of the University of Oxford
Academic staff of Concordia University
Irish expatriates in Canada